Hurricane Ava was the earliest forming Category 5 hurricane on record in the East Pacific basin. The storm is also tied with 2006's Hurricane Ioke as the fifth-strongest Pacific hurricane on record. It was the first named storm of the 1973 Pacific hurricane season. Forming in early June, Hurricane Ava eventually reached Category 5 intensity on the Saffir–Simpson hurricane scale, the first Pacific hurricane to do so in June and the earliest ever in a season. Its central pressure made it the most intense known Pacific hurricane at the time. Despite its intensity, Ava stayed at sea without significant impact.

Ava was given the most advanced measurement and reconnaissance available at the time. Recon flights were conducted and meteorological equipment was tested. The hurricane was also photographed from space by satellites and Skylab astronauts.

Meteorological history

It started out nearly stationary, and became a tropical storm late on the same day it formed, the first named storm of the 1973 Pacific hurricane season. Ava then slowly moved westwards away from Mexico and became a hurricane on June 3. Ava became a major hurricane on the afternoon of June 5. These measurements made Hurricane Ava by far the most intense storm of the season.

These winds made the storm a Category 5 hurricane on the Saffir–Simpson hurricane scale (SSHS), the highest category on the scale, and the first Category 5 hurricane since the 1959 season. Ava was also a hurricane with windspeeds rapidly increasing the closer to the eye they were measured.

After its peak, Ava started weakening on June 7, as it continued its westward path. Later that day it weakened to a tropical storm. Tropical Storm Ava became Tropical Depression Ava on June 11. The system then turned north and dissipated on June 12. Its remnants then became embedded in the trade winds as a tropical wave.

Forecasting and observation

In terms of how well it was forecast, Ava had the largest error of any cyclone during the season. This 14° error five days out was mainly due to its northward turn when it was a weakening depression.

For a few days, Ava was directly underneath Skylab during its first manned mission. Astronauts acquired photographs of the hurricane, which was big enough for Science Pilot Joseph Kerwin to describe it as "an enormous spiral" that was big enough to dominate the view outside the space station's window and prevent anything else from being seen. Astronauts also provided microwave data through Earth Resources Experiment Package sensors. Skylab also used a scatterometer on the system. Unfortunately, Skylab's scatterometer data was harder to use than normal as it was degraded.

Ava was also underneath the NOAA-2 and Nimbus 5 weather satellites. NOAA-2 provided photographs that were used to estimate Ava's maximum windspeeds. Satellite images were useful throughout the cyclone's existence, as did the wind reports of three ships when Ava was a young tropical storm. Nimbus 5 carried an Electrically Scanning Microwave Radiometer and Temperature-Humidity Infrared Radiometer. Both were used to study Ava. The main data provided by the THIR was data indicating cloud temperatures. The ESMR's main data was on rainfall rates, densities, and distributions. The observations also provided confirmation that clouds that are not vertically developed very much can produce tropical rainfall.

Recon aircraft also penetrated Hurricane Ava. It was the first Pacific hurricane penetrated by National Oceanographic and Atmospheric Administration aircraft, but not by aircraft from other agencies. NOAA craft were laden with sensors and measured wave heights reaching  with a microwave radar system and a laser altimeter. That was the first time ever that sea conditions in a tropical cyclone had been measured that way. United States Air Force planes measured central pressure, air temperature, and humidity in the eye pressures using dropsondes. The collection of data from both space and the air was done in order to allow comparisons. Collectively, all of this measuring made Hurricane Ava the best-measured northeastern Pacific tropical cyclone at the time.

Impact and records

Hurricane Ava stayed at sea. Consequently, no one was killed and there was no reported damage. However, when it was a recently named tropical storm, Ava did cause sustained winds below gale-force to three ships called the Joseph Lykes, Hoegh Trotter, and Volnay. In addition, large ocean waves churned up by Ava created hazardous surf and strong riptides at Southern California beaches on June 9 and June 10. Those waves made beaches more hazardous, resulting in double-to-triple the usual contingent of lifeguards throughout Southern California beaches. At Seal Beach and Newport Beach, lifeguards made 35 and 75 rescues, respectively.

When it was active, Hurricane Ava set many records. Several have since been broken, but Ava still holds a few. Ava ceased being a Category 5 hurricane on June 7, 1973. Emilia (1994) reached Category 5 intensity on July 19, 1994. This span of 7,712 days, which Ava began and Emilia ended, is the longest time between successive Category 5 hurricanes in the northeastern Pacific, and anywhere worldwide, in recorded history. When Hurricane Gilma reached Category 5 strength on July 24, also in 1994, it marked the shortest gap between Category 5 Pacific hurricanes recorded. Ava was also a Category 5 hurricane for exactly 24 hours; a record at the time. Hurricane John broke that in the 1994 season, and hurricanes Linda and Ioke also lasted longer, tied with John. In addition, Ava is the strongest June tropical cyclone in the western hemisphere north of the equator.

A spokesperson from the U.S. National Weather Service was quoted as saying that, "Ava had sustained winds of about 180 knots with some gusts at 200 knots when she  was peaking". However, the official "Best track" data file and the seasonal summary in the Monthly Weather Review contradict that report and give maximum winds of 140 knots. If Ava's winds were that high, they would one of the highest ever reported in a tropical cyclone anywhere. Like any report of winds that high it is suspect.

Ava is now the fifth-most intense, tied with Hurricane Ioke, as hurricanes Patricia, Linda, Rick and Kenna recorded lower pressures. However, Linda's and Rick's pressures were only estimated from satellite imagery, so Ava held the record for lowest measured pressure until Kenna surpassed it in 2002. However, the meteorological record for the eastern north Pacific are unreliable because geostationary satellite observation did not begin until 1966. These two factors mean that Ava's lowest pressure may be below , and that there may be other cyclones stronger than Ava.

See also

 List of Pacific hurricanes
 Hurricane Celia (2010)

References

External links
 National Hurricane Center

Ava
Ava
Ava (1973)
1973 in California
1973 natural disasters in the United States